Events from the year 1637 in art.

Events
 October 13 – English Royal Navy first-rate ship of the line  is launched at Woolwich Dockyard at a cost of £65,586, adorned from stern to bow with gilded carvings after a design by Anthony van Dyck.
 Claude Lorrain produces a series of etchings of a display of fireworks in Rome.
 Nicolas Poussin begins to paint the first series of Seven Sacraments.

Works

Paintings

 Cornelis de Baellieur
 Interior of an Art Gallery
 Claude Lorrain
 Landscape with a Country Dance
 Seaport (Villa Medici)
 Pieter de Grebber – Elisha refusing the gifts of Naaman
 Rembrandt – A Polish Nobleman
 Anthony van Dyck – Prince Rupert of the Rhine (approximate date)

Sculptures
 Bernini – Bust of King Charles I of England

Births
March 5 – Jan van der Heyden, painter, printmaker and inventor (died 1712)
April 16 – Jean-Jacques Clérion, French sculptor (died 1714)
June 25 – Christophe Veyrier, French sculptor (died 1689)
December 12 – Cesare Gennari, Italian painter (died 1688)
date unknown
Abraham Begeyn, Dutch painter of landscapes and cattle (died 1697)
Niccolò Berrettoni, Italian painter (died 1682)
Francesco Bonifaccio, Italian painter (d. unknown)
Sigismondo Caula, Italian painter (died 1724)
Andrea Celesti, Venetian painter (died 1712)
Martin Desjardins, French sculptor and stuccoist of Dutch birth (died 1694)
Carl Ferdinand Fabritius, German painter (died 1673)
Vicente Salvador Gómez, Spanish Baroque painter (died 1678)
Giovanni Marracci, Italian painter (died 1704)
Giovanni Moneri, Italian painter (died 1714)
Pieter Mulier II, Dutch Golden Age painter (died 1701)
Michelangelo Palloni, Italian painter (died 1712)
Niccola Ricciolini, Italian painter (d. unknown)
Girolamo Troppa – Italian painter of the Baroque (died 1710)

Deaths
January 3 - Daniel Rabel, French painter, engraver, miniaturist, botanist and natural history illustrator (born 1578)
March 6 - Crispijn van de Passe the Elder, Dutch publisher and engraver (born 1564)
July 12 – Willem van Haecht, Flemish painter (born 1593)
September 14 – Theodoor Rombouts, Flemish painter (born 1597)
December 27 – Vincenzo Giustiniani, art collector, patron of Caravaggio (born 1564)
date unknown
Honami Kōetsu, Japanese craftsman, founder of the Rinpa school (born 1558)
Diego de Leyva, Spanish religious painter (born c. 1580)
Willem de Passe, Dutch engraver and designer of medals (born 1598)
Arent Passer, stonemason and architect (born c. 1560)
Domenico Robusti, painter (born 1562)
Cornelis Verbeeck – Dutch painter of the Baroque period (born 1590)

 
Years of the 17th century in art
1630s in art